The Halacha Yomis Program (or Halacha Yomit, as it is known in Israel) is a learning program which covers the entire Shulchan Aruch Orach Chaim followed by the Kitzur Shulchan Aruch. The cycle takes about 4 years to complete. Every day, Jewish participants study 3 se’ifim (subsections) of Shulchan Aruch or 5 se’ifim of Kitzur. 

Kitzur Shulchan Aruch is covered in addition to Shulchan Aruch Orach Chaim to include the generally applicable halachas not included in Orach Chaim.

History 
The Halacha Yomis was started circa 1950 by Rabbi Yonah Sztencl, under the guidance of many Orthodox Jewish leaders of the time, including the Chazon Ish. The Halacha Yomis, and the Mishna Yomis (also started at about the same time), were launched in the memory of the six million Jews that were murdered in the Holocaust.

Breslov hasidim have a similar practice to daily review the Shulchan Aruch.

See also 
Other study cycles, under Torah study #Study cycles

References

External links
OUKosher.org: Halacha Yomis 

Jewish law
Jewish education